BBC Sessions is a live album by the British rock band Cream, released on 25 May 2003 on Polydor Records. It contains 22 tracks and 4 interviews recorded live at the BBC studios in London.

Between 21 October 1966 and 9 January 1968, Cream recorded eight sessions for the BBC radio network, selected highlights from seven of which are featured in chronological order on this collection.

Only the versions of "Steppin' Out" and "Lawdy Mama" had been previously released, although both were released on Eric Clapton's Crossroads box set, not by the band itself.

BBC Sessions was later included as the third disc in the "limited edition box set" release of Cream's 2005 compilation album I Feel Free – Ultimate Cream (also known as Gold).

Track listing

Omissions 
Whilst a recording exists in private hands, this collection includes no material from Cream's first BBC session on 21 October 1966 at Maida Vale 4, London as broadcast on Band Beat, BBC World Service, 21 November 1966. The tracks recorded at this session were "Sleepy Time Time", "Rollin' and Tumblin'" and "Spoonful".

Other songs missing from this collection:
 "Sleepy Time Time" and "I'm So Glad" from the Saturday Club session recorded 8 November 1966 at the BBC Playhouse Theatre.
 "Sitting on Top of the World" and "Steppin' Out" from the Guitar Club session recorded 28 November 1966 at Aeolian 2.
 "Traintime" and "Toad" from the Saturday Club session recorded 10 January 1967 at the BBC Playhouse Theatre.
 "Tales of Brave Ulysses" from the Top Gear session recorded 24 October 1967 at Aeolian 2 – a recording exists in private hands.
 "Blue Condition" and "We're Going Wrong" from the Top Gear session recorded 9 January 1968 at Aeolian 2.

Personnel 
 Eric Clapton – guitar, vocals
 Jack Bruce – bass, lead vocals, harmonica
 Ginger Baker – drums, percussion, vocals

References 

Cream (band) live albums
BBC Radio recordings
2003 live albums
2003 compilation albums
Polydor Records compilation albums
Polydor Records live albums
Cream (band) compilation albums